The PFL 7 mixed martial arts event for the 2019 season of the Professional Fighters League was held on October 11, 2019, at the Mandalay Bay Events Center in Las Vegas, Nevada.

Background
The event was the seventh of the 2019 season and marked the start of the playoffs for the Welterweight and Women's Lightweight divisions.

Kayla Harrison was initially scheduled to face Genah Fabian at this event. However, Fabian missed weight and was replaced by Bobbi-Jo Dalziel.

Results

2019 PFL Welterweight playoffs

2019 PFL Women's Lightweight playoffs

See also
List of PFL events
List of current PFL fighters

References

Professional Fighters League
2019 in mixed martial arts
Mixed martial arts in Las Vegas
Sports competitions in Las Vegas
2019 in sports in Nevada
October 2019 sports events in the United States